The canton of Vailly-sur-Aisne is a former administrative division in northern France. It was disbanded following the French canton reorganisation which came into effect in March 2015. It consisted of 26 communes, which joined the canton of Fère-en-Tardenois in 2015. It had 10,170 inhabitants (2012).

The canton comprised the following communes:

Aizy-Jouy
Allemant
Braye
Bucy-le-Long
Celles-sur-Aisne
Chavignon
Chavonne
Chivres-Val
Clamecy
Condé-sur-Aisne
Filain
Laffaux
Margival
Missy-sur-Aisne
Nanteuil-la-Fosse
Neuville-sur-Margival
Ostel
Pargny-Filain
Pont-Arcy
Sancy-les-Cheminots
Soupir
Terny-Sorny
Vailly-sur-Aisne
Vaudesson
Vregny
Vuillery

Demographics

See also
Cantons of the Aisne department

References

Former cantons of Aisne
2015 disestablishments in France
States and territories disestablished in 2015